Roland Paul Dille (September 16, 1924 – May 26, 2014) was an American academic. He was president of Minnesota State University Moorhead (MSUM) from 1968 to 1994.

Biography 
Dille was born on a farm near Dassel, Minnesota. He took a bachelor’s degree in English Literature at the University of Minnesota. While serving in the Army during World War II he was awarded the Bronze Star. After military service, he earned a doctorate from Minnesota in 1962, with a thesis "David Garnett and the Bloomsbury group."

Career
From 1956 to 1961 he taught at St. Olaf College in Northfield, then at California Lutheran College, and finally came to Moorhead in 1963. He was dean of academic affairs there from 1966, and president from 1968. He retired in 1994.

Honors
Member, National Council for the Humanities
President of the American Association of State Colleges and Universities
Acting chancellor of the Minnesota State University System

References

 

1924 births
2014 deaths
Minnesota State University Moorhead faculty
University of Minnesota College of Liberal Arts alumni
St. Olaf College faculty
People from Meeker County, Minnesota